Lands End is a historic home located near Naxera, Gloucester County, Virginia, United States.  It was built about 1798, and is a two-story, three-bay, steeply-pitched gambrel-roofed brick dwelling. It has a single pile plan and a 2½-story rear wing.  It was renovated in the 1960s.

It was added to the National Register of Historic Places in 1974.

References

External links
Land's End, Severn River, Naxera, Gloucester County, VA: 5 photos and 2 data pages at Historic American Buildings Survey

Historic American Buildings Survey in Virginia
Houses on the National Register of Historic Places in Virginia
Houses completed in 1798
Houses in Gloucester County, Virginia
National Register of Historic Places in Gloucester County, Virginia